Ossian Berger (13 February 1849–28 December 1914) was a Swedish politician and lawyer. He was the minister of justice between 1902 and 1905.

Early life and education
Berger was born in Nysund parish, Örebro county, on 13 February 1849. He graduated from Uppsala University receiving a bachelor's degree in law and also obtained a PhD in law from the same university.

Career
Following his graduation Berger served as judge in different cities. He worked as an ombudsman before he was appointed minister of justice in 1902. During his tenure several bills were presented on the arrangement of literary property. In 1904 he presented a bill that would make the state obliged to provide assistance to the detainees if they requested. However, his proposal was not endorsed by the Riksdag. On 2 August 1905 he resigned from the office. After retiring from politics he continued to work in different legal posts.

Personal life and death
Berger did not get married. He died in Uppsala county on 28 December 1914.

References

External links

19th-century Swedish lawyers
20th-century Swedish lawyers
1849 births
1914 deaths
Members of the Riksdag
Swedish Ministers for Justice
Uppsala University alumni
Ombudsmen in Sweden